The Antonov An-74 (NATO reporting name: Coaler) is a Soviet/Ukrainian transport aircraft developed by Antonov. It is a variant of the An-72.

The An-72 and An-74 get their nickname, from the large engine intake ducts, which resemble the oversized ears of the popular Soviet animated character of the same name.

Design and development
The An-74 was initially an upgrade of the An-72 test aircraft, intended to be used in the Arctic and Antarctica; and had the designation An-72A "Arctic". It can operate to and from low grade airstrips such as concrete, pebble, ice and snow aerodromes.

Produced in tandem with the An-72, the An-74 can be fitted with wheel-ski landing gear, de-icing equipment and a number of other upgrades allowing the aircraft to support operations in Arctic or Antarctic environments.

An unusual design feature of the An-74 (as well as An-72) is the use of the Coandă effect to improve STOL performance, utilizing engine exhaust gases blown over the wing's upper surface to boost lift. The powerplant used is the Lotarev D-36 turbofan engine. The An-74 bears some resemblance to the unsuccessful Boeing YC-14, a prototype design from the early 1970s which had also used overwing engines and the Coandă effect.

The rear fuselage of the aircraft has a hinged loading ramp with a rear fairing that slides backwards and up to clear the opening. The aircraft may also be used for highly specialized operations:
 pilotage and vessel escort;
 establishing and servicing of drifting stations;
 research operations in Arctic or Antarctic regions;
 visual ice patrol;
 fishery reconnaissance.

Operational history

As of January 1, 2006, twenty-three out of thirty aircraft registered in Russia were in operation.

Variants

 An-74: Arctic/Antarctic support model with room for five crew, increased fuel capacity, larger radar in bulged nose radome, improved navigation equipment, better de-icing equipment, and can be fitted with wheel-skis landing gear.
 An-74-200: Military transport based on the An-74T
 An-74-200D: VIP/executive transport version of the An-74TK-200. Also called An-74D.
 An-74A: Passenger or freighter model.
 An-74MP: Marine Patrol version. Can transport 44 soldiers, 22 paratroops, 16 stretchers with medical staff, or ten tonnes of cargo.
 An-74T: Freighter version equipped with an internal winch, roller equipment, and cargo mooring points, can also be fitted with static lines for paratroops or dropping air cargo.
 An-74T-100: Cargo version with four crew.
 An-74T-200: Cargo version with two crew.
 An-74T-200A: Military Transport aircraft
 An-74TK-100: Convertible version of the An-74T-100. It could be configured for passengers, cargo or both.
 An-74TK-100S: Medevac version of An-74TK-100.
 An-74TK-200: Convertible version of the An-74T-200.
 An-74TK-200C: Cargo variant of An-74TK-200
 An-74TK-200S: Medevac version of An-74T-200.
  An-148: An-74 model designed primarily for civil customers with more fuel-efficient, conventionally mounted engines that trade the STOL capabilities of earlier models for lower operating costs and higher speed. Additional emphasis is placed on improved avionics and passenger comfort features. It was initially designated An-74TK-300, making its first flight in 2004.
 An-158: Modification of the An-148.
 An-74-400: Proposed stretch model of the An-148 (An-74TK-300) with a fuselage insert to extend its length by 26 ft (8 m) and uprated engines.

Operators

Civilian

Pouya Air

 UTair Cargo
 Shar Ink
 2nd Sverdlovsk Air Enterprise

 Motor Sich Airlines

Military

 Egyptian Air Force: Nine (An-74T-200A) (four more on order)

 Islamic Republic of Iran Air Force: Four (An-74TK-200), seven (An-74T-200); later transferred to Iranian Revolutionary Guard

 Turkmen Air Force: Two (An-74TK-200)

Notable accidents and incidents
 On 16 September 1991, an An-74 carrying a cargo shipment of fish from Petropavlovsk-Kamchatskiy to Kyiv via Lensk and Omsk crashed after takeoff from Lensk Airport, killing all 13 people on board. The cause of the accident was an overloading of the aircraft, combined with the premature retraction of the wing flaps.
 On 23 April 2006, a Libyan Air Force An-74TK-200 carrying food aid to Chad crashed near the village of Kousséri in neighbouring Cameroon after abandoning its landing at N'Djamena. All six Ukrainian crew members were confirmed dead.
 On 27 November 2006, an Iranian Revolutionary Guards Corps Antonov An-74, serial number 15-2255, crashed on takeoff at Tehran Mehrabad Airport. There were 37 fatalities, out of 38 occupants on board the aircraft.
 On 29 July 2017, An-74TK100 UR-CKC of CAVOK Air crashed on take-off from São Tomé International Airport and was damaged beyond repair. A birdstrike was reported and the aircraft overran the end of the runway whilst attempting to abort the take-off. 
 On 3 August 2020, An-74TK-100 RA-74044 of UTair was written off during a runway excursion after arriving at Gao International Airport, Mali from Modibo Keita International Airport. The aircraft had been carrying out operations for the United Nations task force MINUSMA. No fatalities were reported, but all 11 people on board sustained injuries of varying severity.
 On 24 February 2022, an unknown Antonov An-74 was reported to have been destroyed by Russian artillery along with the Antonov An-225 and other aircraft in the battle in Hostomel, Kyiv.

Specifications

See also

References

External links

 An-74TK-200 Technical characteristics
 An-72/An-74 Family ( Data for An-72A & List of all known An-72/An-74 Family variants )
 An-74 Pictures
 An-74TK-200 modification at KSAMC site
 An-74TK-300 modification at KSAMC site
 AN-74TK-300 modification at Antonov's site
 AN-74T modification at Antonov's site

An-074
1980s Soviet cargo aircraft
1980s Soviet military transport aircraft
Twinjets
T-tail aircraft
Aircraft first flown in 1983
Engine-over-wing aircraft